The Pacific Ocean is the largest ocean in the world.

Pacific may also refer to:

Places

Related to the Pacific Ocean
Pacific-Antarctic Ridge, oceanic ridge at the boundary between the Pacific and Antarctic tectonic plates
Pacific-Farallon Ridge, former oceanic ridge at the boundary between the Pacific and Farallon tectonic plates
Pacific-Kula Ridge, former oceanic ridge at the boundary between the Pacific and Kula tectonic plates
Pacific Rim, political and economic term used to designate the countries on the edges of the Pacific Ocean as well as the various island nations within the region

Places
Pacific, California, community in El Dorado County
Pacific, Missouri, place in the United States
Pacific, Washington, city in King County, Washington
 Pacific, Wisconsin
Pacific County, Washington
Pacific Highway (disambiguation), any one of several highways around the world
Pacific Time Zone

Military history
Asiatic-Pacific Theater (aka Pacific Theater of Operations), the term used in the United States for all military activity in the Pacific Ocean and the countries bordering it during World War II
Pacific Ocean Areas (command), the major Allied military command in the Pacific Ocean theatre of World War II
Pacific Ocean theater of World War II, one of four major theaters of the Pacific War, between 1941 and 1945
Pacific War, the part of World War II — and preceding conflicts — that took place in the Pacific Ocean, its islands, and in East Asia, from 1937 to 1945
War of the Pacific, fought between Chile and the joint forces of Bolivia and Peru, from 1879 to 1884

Art, entertainment, and media

Pacific Theatres, a movie theater chain in southern California
Pacific TV, an Indonesian television station
The Pacific (miniseries), an HBO TV miniseries about the US involvement in the Pacific during World War II
Pacific Jazz Records, a Los Angeles-based record company and label
Pacific (1978 album), an album by Haruomi Hosono, Shigeru Suzuki and Tatsuro Yamashita
 Pacific (NEWS album), a 2007 album by NEWS
"Pacific" also known as "Pacific State" a 1989 single by 808 State
 Pacific (book), a non-fiction book by Simon Winchester
Pacific, a painting by Alex Colville

Companies
A&P (The Great Atlantic & Pacific Tea Company), a former American and Canadian supermarket chain
COSCO Pacific, a Chinese port operator
Georgia-Pacific, an American pulp and paper company
Pacific Basin Shipping Limited, a Hong Kong shipping company
Pacific Investment Management, an investment company
Pacific Trucks, a Canadian heavy truck maker

Schools
Pacific High School (disambiguation), the name of several American high schools
Pacific University, a private college in Oregon
Universidad del Pacífico (disambiguation), usually translated as "University of the Pacific", any of a number of distinct Latin American universities
University of the Pacific (United States), a private university in California
University of the South Pacific

Sports
Pacific FC, a Canadian soccer team
Pacific F.C. (Mexico), a former Mexican football team
Pacific Grand Prix, former Formula 1 race in Japan
Pacific Racing, an extinct Formula 1 team
Pacific Tigers, the intercollegiate sports program of the University of the Pacific in California

Transportation

Airlines
 Air Pacific (now called Fiji Airways), a Fijian airline
 Cathay Pacific, a Hong Kong airline
 Pacific Airlines, an airline based in Vietnam
 Pacific Air Lines, a defunct airline

Railroads and trains
 Pacific, a name often given to steam locomotives of the 4-6-2 wheel arrangement
 Southern Pacific Railroad, a former Class 1 railroad network in the United States
 Union Pacific Railroad, a railroad network in the United States

Ships
 , a cruise ship formerly known as the MS Pacific Princess
 Pacific-class patrol boat, a class of 22 patrol boats built by Australia and donated to twelve South Pacific countries
 , a transatlantic sidewheel steamer of the Collins Line that sank off the coast of Wales in 1856
 , an ocean liner that sank off the coast of Washington State in 1875
 , later renamed SS Hewitt, a steam freighter that went missing off the United States Atlantic coast in 1921.

People 
 Saint Pacific (Pacificus of San Severino), Roman catholic saint (1653 – 1721)

See also

 
 Pacifique (disambiguation)
 Pacific City (disambiguation)